My Mom or My Mum may refer to:

 "My Mom", song by The Osmond Brothers
 "My Mom", song by Eminem from Relapse (Eminem album)